Ernie Cope (born July 17, 1969) is currently the competition director at JTG Daugherty Racing.  He is a former American stock car racing crew chief and a former competitor in the NASCAR Winston Cup Series, Craftsman Truck Series and Winston West Series. He is also the cousin of 1990 Daytona 500 champion, Derrike Cope.

Driving career
He began his professional career at the age of 19 in the NASCAR Northwest Tour, winning the series' most popular driver award in 1994. In 1995 he moved to the Winston West Series and won Rookie of the Year honors as well as the Most Popular Driver award. Also that year he attempted to make his Winston Cup debut at Sears Point Raceway, as part of a combination race between the Winston Cup and Winston West series, but failed to qualify. He was able to qualify for the fall combination race at Phoenix International Raceway; however, he qualified last in the 44 car field, taking a provisional, and was the first car out of the race, retiring after 19 laps due to engine failure. It would be his only Cup Series start.

In 1996 he raced in four Craftsman Truck Series races, all in the western United States with a best finish of 19th at Portland International Raceway. He finished 57th in points. He made one start each in 1997 and 1998 and made four starts in 1999 with a best finish of 22nd at Evergreen Speedway; he finished 49th in points that season, his best points finish in the series.

Crew chief career
Cope retired from full-time racing at the end of the 1995 season and accepted a position at Geoff Bodine Racing to crew chief the #7 in the Truck Series.  He was Sadler Motorsports' crew chief in 2004 and served in various capacities with Robert Yates Racing in 2005. In 2006 and 2007 he was the crew chief for Wood Brothers/JTG Racing's #59 team in the Busch Series. In 2008 he moved to Kevin Harvick Incorporated to crew chief the #2 Truck Series entry driven by Jack Sprague. In 2009 and 2010 he was the crew chief for KHI's #33 Nationwide Series entry. For 2011, Cope remained with KHI, being the crew chief for Elliott Sadler; he remained with the team when it was sold to Richard Childress Racing, acting as crew chief for the No. 33 with a variety of drivers in 2012 and 2013. In addition, he substituted for Luke Lambert as crew chief for Jeff Burton in the Sprint Cup Series in early 2013. In October 2013 he left RCR, being replaced by Nick Harrison. On December 12, 2013, it was announced that Cope would become the crew chief for the No. 5 of JR Motorsports in the Nationwide Series in 2014. On August 18, 2014, Cope was announced as the crew chief of JR Motorsports' No. 9, driven by Chase Elliott, in 2015.  Cope left JR Motorsports at the end of the 2015 season to become the Competition Director at JTG Daugherty Racing beginning in 2016. He substituted for Randall Burnett as crew chief for A. J. Allmendinger at the June 2016 Axalta "We Paint Winners" 400 race at Pocono Raceway.

Motorsports career results

NASCAR
(key) (Bold - Pole position awarded by time. Italics - Pole position earned by points standings. * – Most laps led.)

Winston Cup Series

Craftsman Truck Series

References

External links
 
 

Living people
1969 births
People from Spanaway, Washington
Sportspeople from the Seattle metropolitan area
Racing drivers from Washington (state)
NASCAR crew chiefs
NASCAR drivers
Cope family